The 1976 Central Michigan Chippewas football team represented Central Michigan University in the Mid-American Conference (MAC) during the 1976 NCAA Division I football season. In their tenth season under head coach Roy Kramer, the Chippewas compiled a 7–4 record (4–3 against MAC opponents), finished in a tie for fourth place in the MAC standings, and outscored their opponents, 223 to 219. The team played its home games in Perry Shorts Stadium in Mount Pleasant, Michigan, with attendance of 91,345 in five home games.

The team's statistical leaders included quarterback Ron Rummel with 761 passing yards, running back Mike Gray with 734 rushing yards, and tight end Wayne Schwalbach with 496 receiving yards. Offensive guard John Kloc and defensive tackle John Wunderlich were co-recipients of the team's most valuable player award. Wunderlich, Schwalbach, and defensive back Ed Rykulski received first-team All-MAC honors. Placekicker Rade Savich kicked 14 field goals, a school record that he broke in 1978.

Schedule

References

Central Michigan
Central Michigan Chippewas football seasons
Central Michigan Chippewas football